Tuluksak Airport  is a state-owned public-use airport serving Tuluksak, in the Bethel Census Area of the U.S. state of Alaska.

Facilities 
Tuluksak Airport has one runway designated 2/20 with a gravel and dirt surface measuring 2,461 by 30 feet (750 x 9 m).

References

External links
 FAA Alaska airport diagram (GIF)

Airports in the Bethel Census Area, Alaska